Pablo Muñoz may refer to:

Pablo Muñoz de la Morena (1769-1848), Spanish commander
Pablo Muñoz Vega (1903-1994), Ecuadorian Roman Catholic prelate and cardinal
Pablo Muñoz (footballer) (born 2003), Spanish footballer
Pablo Muñoz (ice hockey), player for the Spanish national team at events such as the 2018 Winter Olympics